Mystery Lady: Songs of Billie Holiday is the eighteenth studio album by Etta James, released in 1994. The album reached a peak position of number two on Billboard Top Jazz Albums chart and won the 1995 Grammy Award for Best Jazz Vocal Album.

Track listing
All the songs on this album are covers of songs originally performed by or covered by Billie Holiday during her lifetime.

References

1994 albums
Billie Holiday tribute albums
Etta James albums
Grammy Award for Best Jazz Vocal Album
Private Music albums